Andon may refer to:

 Andon (manufacturing), a system for notifying management, maintenance, and other workers of a quality or process problem
 A Japanese traditional paper lantern
 Andon, journal of the Society for Japanese Arts
 Andon, Alpes-Maritimes, France
 Andon (name), a male given name
 Andon of Andon and Fonta, the first two human beings on planet Earth, according to the Urantia Book